Iđoš is a village in Serbia. It is situated in the Kikinda municipality, North Banat District, in the Autonomous Province of Vojvodina. The village has a Serb ethnic majority (88.13%) and its population numbering 2,174 people (2002 census).

The Gradište archaeological site located in the village is part of the Cultural Heritage of Serbia list, inscribed in 1991.

Historical population

1961: 2,857
1971: 2,540
1981: 2,338
1991: 2,263
2002: 2,174

References

Slobodan Ćurčić, Broj stanovnika Vojvodine, Novi Sad, 1996.

See also
List of places in Serbia
List of cities, towns and villages in Vojvodina

Populated places in Serbian Banat
Kikinda